A night train is a train that rides overnight, usually conveying sleeping cars.

Night Train or Nightrain may refer to:

Film and television
Night Train (1959 film) (Pociąg), a Polish film directed by Jerzy Kawalerowicz
Night Train (1998 film), a film directed by John Lynch
Night Train (1999 film), a film directed by Les Bernstien
Night Train (2007 film), a Chinese film directed by Diao Yi'nan
Night Train (2009 film), a thriller starring Danny Glover, Leelee Sobieski, and Steve Zahn
"Night Train", the ABC Mystery Movie broadcast as the final episode of the series B.L. Stryker on May 5, 1990

Music
Night Train (band), an Australian rock band
"Night Train", a scene from the opera Einstein on the Beach, composed by Philip Glass

Albums 
Night Train (Oscar Peterson album), a 1962 album by the Oscar Peterson Trio
Night Train (Jason Aldean album), 2012
Night Train (Bill Morrissey album), 1993
Night Train (EP), a 2010 EP by Keane
James Brown Presents His Band/Night Train, a 1961 album - see James Brown discography
Night Train, an album by Amina Figarova
Night Train, an album by Brown Intentions, featuring Down AKA Kilo

Opera

Songs 
"Night Train" (Jimmy Forrest composition), a 1951 jazz and blues standard 
"Night Train" (Jason Aldean song), 2013
"Night Train" (Visage song), 1982
"Nightrain", a 1987 song by Guns N' Roses
"Night Train", a song from Supply and Demand by Amos Lee
"Night Train", a song from Anchors Aweigh by The Bouncing Souls
"Night Train (Smooth Alligator)", a song from Dancing on the Ceiling by Lionel Richie
"Nighttrain", a song from Apocalypse 91... The Enemy Strikes Black by Public Enemy
"Night Train", a song from Rickie Lee Jones by Rickie Lee Jones
"Night Train", a song from Take Your Time by Scatman John
"Night Train", a song from Arc of a Diver by Steve Winwood
"Night Train", a song from Thomas & Friends

Other uses 
 Night Train (test), a United States biological weapons test c. 1962–1973
 Night Train (novel), a 1997 novel by Martin Amis
 Night Train (painting), a 1947 painting by Paul Delvaux
 Night Train (radio show), a weekly radio show in Miami
 Night Train, a mural by Blue Sky
 Night Train, the cargo vessel involved in Night Train Seizure, one of the largest drug seizures in history
 Night Train Express or Night Train, a brand of low-end flavored fortified wines made by E & J Gallo Winery
 Night Train, a Harley-Davidson softail motorcycle model
 Night Train, a bobsled driven by Steven Holcomb
 Night Train Lane (1927–2002), nickname of American football player Richard Lane